Kara Salmela (born June 16, 1972) is an American biathlete. She competed at the 1998 Winter Olympics and the 2002 Winter Olympics.

References

External links
 

1972 births
Living people
Biathletes at the 1998 Winter Olympics
Biathletes at the 2002 Winter Olympics
American female biathletes
Olympic biathletes of the United States
People from Elk River, Minnesota
21st-century American women
U.S. Army World Class Athlete Program